Cupitha is a genus of butterflies in the family Hesperiidae. It is monotypic, being represented by the single species Cupitha purreea, commonly known as the wax dart.

Distribution
Cupitha purreea is found from southern India and Sikkim to Burma, southern Yunnan, the Andamans, Thailand, Laos, Langkawi, Malaysia, Tioman, Borneo, Sumatra, Nias, Java, the Philippines and Sulawesi.

Description

Biology
Larvae are known to fed on Quisqualis indica, Terminalia paniculata, Terminalia bellirica, Combretum ovalifolium and Ehretia.

References

Hesperiinae
Butterflies of Asia
Butterflies of Indochina
Monotypic butterfly genera
Hesperiidae genera